Brett Prebble (born 23 September 1977) is an Australian jockey, currently based in Melbourne, Victoria. Having ridden over 1200 career winners, Prebble's most famous win came aboard Green Moon in the 2012 Emirates Melbourne Cup.

Personal life
Prebble was born in Melbourne, Victoria. He and his wife have two children. He is the brother-in-law of two Melbourne Cup-winning jockeys: Michelle Payne, who won the Cup in 2015, and Kerrin McEvoy, who won the Cup in 2000, 2016 and 2018.

Career as a jockey
Prebble was a champion jockey in Melbourne before he moved to Hong Kong in 2002. He held the record for the number of winners in a Melbourne Metropolitan racing season, with 99 winners and one dead heat in 1999–2000, until Jamie Kah set a new record in July 2021 when she rode her 100th winner for the 2020–21 season.

His competition with Douglas Whyte for the 2009–10 Hong Kong Jockeys' Championship was one of the closest in Hong Kong racing history, with Whyte winning 100 to 99. His winning tally of 78 in the 2010–11 season brought his overall total in Hong Kong to 525.

In 2012 Prebble won Australia's most famous race, the Melbourne Cup, on Green Moon. He was chosen to ride Green Moon, owned by Lloyd Williams and trained by Robert Hickmott, in place of Damien Oliver, who was dropped from the ride after being accused of betting illegally. Green Moon went on to win the race by one length.

Major wins
Australia
 Melbourne Cup – (1) – Green Moon (2012)
 Caulfield Cup – (1) – Incentivise (2021)   
 Golden Slipper Stakes – (1) – Crystal Lily (2010)
 Australian Guineas – (1) – Wandjina (2015)
 Caulfield Stakes – (1) – Probabeel (2021)
 Emirates Stakes – (1) – Titanic Jack (2003) 
 J.J. Atkins – (1) – Lovely Jubbly (2002) Makybe Diva Stakes – (1) – Incentivise (2021) Memsie Stakes – (1) – Behemoth (2021) Oakleigh Plate – (1) – Miss Kournikova (2001) Queensland Derby – (1) – De Gaulle Lane (2001) Sires' Produce Stakes (BRC) – (1) – Lovely Jubbly (2002) Sires' Produce Stakes (VRC) – (1) – Winestock (2003) Sir Rupert Clarke Stakes – (1) – Testa Rossa (2000) The Galaxy – (1) – Black Bean (2000) The Goodwood – (1) – Keeper (2001) Turnbull Stakes – (1) – Incentivise (2021)
 Vinery Stud Stakes – (1) – Hill of Grace (2000) VRC Oaks – (1) – Lovelorn (2000) VRC Sprint Classic – (2) – Miss Pennymoney (2000), Cape of Good Hope (2005)Hong Kong
 Hong Kong Sprint – (3) – Absolute Champion (2006), Sacred Kingdom (2009), Lucky Nine (2011)     
 Champions Mile – (3) – Bullish Luck (2007), Sight Winner (2009), Contentment (2017) Hong Kong Derby – (1) – Vital King(2007) Hong Kong Classic Mile – (1) – Lucky Nine (2011) Centenary Sprint Cup – (3) – Absolute Champion (2008), Sacred Kingdom (2010,2011) Chairman's Sprint Prize – (4) – Absolute Champion (2007), Sacred Kingdom (2010), Lucky Nine (2013,2014) Champions & Chater Cup – (1) – Precision (2003) Queen's Silver Jubilee Cup – (1) – Lucky Nine(2012), Contentment (2016)Japan
 Yasuda Kinen – (1) – Bullish Luck (2007)Singapore
 KrisFlyer International Sprint – (3) – Sacred Kingdom (2009), Lucky Nine (2013,2014)''

Performance

References

1977 births
Australian expatriate sportspeople in Hong Kong
Australian jockeys
Hong Kong jockeys
Living people
Jockeys from Melbourne